Huddy Park is a location in Highlands, New Jersey. Dedicated to the patriot hero Joshua Huddy of the American Revolutionary War, who was hanged there in 1782, Huddy Park is the site of the local "Clamfest" since 1994.

References

Highlands, New Jersey
Parks in Monmouth County, New Jersey